Monells is a village belonging to the municipality of Cruïlles, Monells i Sant Sadurní de l'Heura in the comarca of the Baix Empordà. It is crossed by the Rissec river.

Places of interest

 Church of Sant Genís de Monells
 Jaume I Square

External links
 Informació de la Generalitat de Catalunya

Populated places in Baix Empordà